Michael P. "Mickey" Kearns is an American politician who serves as Clerk of Erie County, New York. Kearns previously represented the 142nd New York State Assembly District, which spans South Buffalo, half of the city of Lackawanna, West Seneca and Orchard Park, from 2012 to 2017; he has also served on the Buffalo Common Council. Kearns was elected Erie County Clerk in a 2017 special election.

Early career
Prior to his election to the Assembly, Kearns served as South Buffalo's representative on the Buffalo Common Council, where he was elected to succeed Jeffrey M. Conrad. Kearns unsuccessfully challenged incumbent Buffalo Mayor Byron Brown in a Democratic primary in the 2009 Buffalo mayoral election.

State Assembly
Kearns is a registered Democrat. He ran for Assembly in a March 2012 special election without the Democrats' support on the lines of the Republican and Independence Parties. He was elected in a special election on March 20, 2012, defeating Chris Fahey, the endorsed Democrat. While he stated his intention to caucus with the Democrats, Kearns also stated that he would not support Speaker Sheldon Silver; this stance mirrored the position taken by Kearns's predecessor, Mark J. F. Schroeder. On May 20, 2013, Kearns left the Assembly Democratic Conference and called for Silver to resign from his post as Speaker of the Assembly; Kearns took these steps after Silver's confidential, taxpayer-funded settlement of sexual harassment claims against fellow Assembly Democrat Vito Lopez became public. Following the ouster of Speaker Silver, Kearns rejoined the Assembly Democratic Conference.

While in the Assembly, Kearns pushed for accountability for banks who allow properties that are the subject of abandoned foreclosures to fall into disrepair, and he fought against a bill that allowed the Western New York Children's Psychiatric Center to be closed or relocated.

Kearns resigned his Assembly seat after being elected Erie County Clerk.

Erie County Clerk
Kearns announced his candidacy for Erie County Clerk in mid-2017 against Democratic candidate and former WBEN host Steve Cichon.  The position had been vacant since January 2017, when then-Clerk Chris Jacobs resigned the post after being elected the New York State Senate. Kearns ran for County Clerk on the Republican, Conservative, Independence, and Reform Party lines, was elected County Clerk in November 2017, and was sworn in on December 5, 2017.

After becoming Erie County Clerk, Kearns urged the State of New York to delay the January 31 recertification deadline for pistol permit holders who obtained their permits before January 2013, arguing that a delay would allow state and county governments to work out kinks in the process. Kearns explained, "'We should not be making law-abiding citizens into criminals based on them not re-certifying.'"

Kearns won re-election to the position of Erie County Clerk in 2018 and 2022.

References

External links
New York State Assembly member website

|-

|-

Year of birth missing (living people)
Living people
Democratic Party members of the New York State Assembly
Buffalo Common Council members
21st-century American politicians